There are four species of bird named chiffchaff:
 Common chiffchaff, Phylloscopus collybita (also often commonly referred to as the chiffchaff)
 Iberian chiffchaff, Phylloscopus ibericus
 Canary Islands chiffchaff, Phylloscopus canariensis
 Western Canary Islands chiffchaff, Phylloscopus canariensis canariensis
 Eastern Canary Islands chiffchaff, Phylloscopus canariensis exsul
 Mountain chiffchaff, Phylloscopus sindianus

Animal common name disambiguation pages